Mauro Antonio Burruchaga (born 27 June 1998) is an Argentine professional footballer who plays as a midfielder.

Club career
Burruchaga made his professional debut for Chievo in a 2-1 Coppa Italia loss to Cagliari Calcio on 5 December 2018.

At the end of January 2020, Burruchaga joined Uruguayan club Deportivo Maldonado. He left the club again at the end of 2020 without making his debut.

Personal life
Burruchaga is the son of Argentine former footballer and FIFA World Cup winner Jorge Burruchaga.

References

External links
 
 Chievo Verona Profile
 Lega Serie A Profile

1998 births
Living people
Footballers from Buenos Aires
Association football midfielders
Argentine footballers
A.C. ChievoVerona players
Deportivo Maldonado players
Serie A players
Argentine expatriate footballers
Argentine expatriate sportspeople in Italy
Argentine expatriate sportspeople in Uruguay
Expatriate footballers in Italy
Expatriate footballers in Uruguay